Loch A' Bharain (the Baron's Loch) is an impounding reservoir in Scotland.

Works were completed by 1810 and after further repair and inspection by 1815 - 1820 the Crinan canal helped bring jobs and industry to the area shortening what would be a longer voyage on boat to get to Crinan and other areas on the west coast. The 9 mile canal became known as a Royal Route when Queen Victoria sailed the canal after works completed, this was part of her tour of Scotland. Loch á Bharain is one of the many many lochs (lakes) and burns (rivers) feeding the Crinan Canal. When the Crinan Canal was drained for repair and inspection in 2020 - 2021, Loch á Bharain was mostly drained, revealing old lock gates, tyres and other bits and pieces as well as the remains (floor plan) of the old castle of Clan McTavish.

The loch is regularly used by Mid Argyll Radio Sailing for model boats.

See also
 List of reservoirs and dams in the United Kingdom

References

Bharain

External links

Mid Argyll Radio Sailing